Derek Hogg (born April 8, 1928) is an English jazz drummer.

Hogg was born in Oldham, and played early in his career with marching bands. He began working in professional ensembles in the 1950s, including those of Freddy Randall, Don Rendell, Joe Saye, Ken Moule, Buddy Featherstonhaugh, and Kenny Baker, as well as with Sandy Brown and Al Fairweather's All Stars group. He played with Vic Lewis in 1959-1960, then with The Squadronaires and Dudley Moore in the first few years of the decade. In 1962 he began working with Danny Moss, with whom he would continue to perform until the end of his career, and also worked later with Rosemary Clooney, Tony Coe, Digby Fairweather, Budd Johnson, Colin Purbrook, and Teddy Wilson. He retired from active performance in 1987.

References
"Derek Hogg". The New Grove Dictionary of Jazz. 2nd edition, ed. Barry Kernfeld.

English jazz drummers
People from Oldham
1928 births
Living people